Winneconne may refer to:

Winneconne, Wisconsin, a village
Winneconne (town), Wisconsin, a town